Assaad Bouab (born July 31, 1980) is a French-Moroccan actor whose first co-starring role was in Whatever Lola Wants, directed by Nabil Ayouch and co-starring Laura Ramsey as Lola. The film premiered on 11 December 2007 at the Dubai International Film Festival. Bouab attended Cours Florent from 1999 to 2002, and graduated from CNSAD in Paris in 2006. He has had a regular role in the awarded and popular French television series Call My Agent!.

Career
From 2017 to 2020, Bouab starred as Hicham Janowski in the French comedy-drama series Call My Agent!. He also played CIA operative Qamar Maloof in the Netflix series Messiah.

In 2021, Bouab starred in the romantic drama television miniseries written and directed by Emily Mortimer, The Pursuit of Love alongside Lily James and Andrew Scott. Bouab joined the cast for the sixth and final season of Peaky Blinders in 2022.

Theatre

Filmography

References

External links

1980 births
French people of Moroccan descent
Living people
People from Rabat
Moroccan male television actors
Moroccan male film actors
Alumni of Lycée Descartes (Rabat)
French National Academy of Dramatic Arts alumni
Cours Florent alumni
21st-century Moroccan male actors